This article summarizes the events, album releases, and album release dates in hip hop music for the year 2014.

Events

January
On January 8, it was revealed that DJ Drama was given a job as the new A&R for Atlantic Records.
On January 15, the duo Outkast composed of rappers Big Boi and Andre 3000, announced a reunion tour of over 40 festival dates during 2014.
On January 26, Macklemore & Ryan Lewis won four Grammy Awards at 56th Annual Grammy Awards, including Best New Artist and Best Rap Album for The Heist. Jay-Z won two Grammys for his two collaborations with Justin Timberlake "Holy Grail" and "Suit & Tie".
On January 28, J. Cole announced that his record label Dreamville Records had signed a distribution deal with Interscope Records. Later that day Jay-Z gave him his original Roc-A-Fella Records chain.

February
On February 1, five rappers French Montana, Jadakiss, Chinx Drugz, Smoke DZA and Buckshot were all arrested on warrants, while leaving  B.B. King Blues Club in New York City, where they were attending Funkmaster Flex's Tunnel Party. They would all be released by the next day.
On February 10, it was revealed that Dr. Dre was suing his former record label Death Row Records for 3 million dollars, due to unpaid royalties.
 On February 20, it was revealed that 50 Cent had officially left Shady Records, Aftermath Entertainment and Interscope Records, also announcing that he was now signed to Caroline Records, an independent sister-label of Capitol Records.

March

 On March 6, Speaker Knockerz was found dead of an apparent heart attack in his garage in Columbia, South Carolina at 19 years old.
 On March 5, Lil Boosie was released from the Louisiana State Penitentiary where he has been incarcerated since 2009 on drug charges.
 On March 9, rapper RondoNumbaNine, along with fellow rapper Cdai, were arrested on murder charges based on their involvement in the murder of a taxi driver named Javan Boyd.
 On March 11, it was revealed that Diddy had bid 200 million dollars on the Madison Square Garden Company-owned Fuse television channel. However, he would be outbid by Jennifer Lopez's NuvoTV.
On March 12, Freddie Gibbs released "Real", his first diss record towards former boss Young Jeezy.
On March 13, Petey Pablo was released from prison after serving 35 months in prison after being arrested for gun smuggling.
On March 14, Chris Brown was arrested and taken to jail until at least April 23, 2014, due to him being kicked out of rehab after he refused to take a drug test, made disturbing comments about his use of weapons, and disobeyed an order placed on him in the facility to remain at least two feet away from all women.
On March 18, Derek Minor announced that he has left Reach Records, as his two-album contract with the label is now complete.
On March 23, Jay-Z addressed Drake's recent comments in a Rolling Stone interview regarding Jay-Z's references to art, during Jay Electronica's remix to Soulja Boy's "We Made It". In the song Jay-Z says, "Sorry Mrs. Drizzy for so much art talk / Silly me, rappin' 'bout shit that I really bought / While these rappers rap about guns that they ain't shot / And a bunch of other silly shit that they ain't got."
On March 25, Diddy changed his stage name back to Puff Daddy for his next studio album MMM.
 On March 28, Migos were involved in a Florida shootout that left one of the members of their entourage in the hospital.
 On March 29, former co-owner of The Source, Benzino, was shot multiple times during his mother's funeral procession.

April
On April 3, Tray Deee of Tha Eastsidaz was released from California Men's Colony, where he had been incarcerated since 2005 on attempted murder charges.
On April 9, Chief Keef's cousin and Glory Boyz Entertainment signee Blood Money was shot and killed in Chicago. Blood Money had been signed to Interscope Records just two weeks prior to his death.
On April 18, the NYPD thwarted an alleged multimillion-dollar extortion plot by producer Chauncey Mahan against Jay-Z. Mahan who worked with Jay Z from 1998 and 2002, was in possession of a number of Jay-Z master recordings that Jay-Z and his associates assumed were lost. They were estimated to be between $15 million and $20 million.
On April 27, DJ E-Z Rock of duo Rob Base and DJ E-Z Rock died from unknown cases. The duo was best known for the single "It Takes Two" and its respective album.

May

On May 1, it was reported Dominican hip hop recording artist Monkey Black, real name Leonardo Ozuna, was fatally stabbed outside a bar in Barcelona, while he was residing in Spain.
On May 5, XXL revealed their annual freshman class to include Chance the Rapper, Isaiah Rashad, Ty Dolla $ign, Rich Homie Quan, Vic Mensa, August Alsina, Troy Ave, Kevin Gates, Lil Bibby, Jon Connor, Lil Durk and Jarren Benton. The list had previously been rappers only, but this opened it to two R&B artists, namely August Alsina and Ty$.
On May 6, Tyga released the song "Chi-Raq to LA" with fellow California based rapper The Game where they diss rival rappers Lil Durk and 40 Glocc, respectively. The same day that Rich Homie Quan suffered two seizures and a head injury from a fall, during a music video shoot for his single "Walk Thru" in Atlanta and had to be rushed to the hospital.
On May 13, Gucci Mane plead guilty to possession of a firearm by a convicted felon in connection with a case during September 2013. He was sentenced to three years and three months in prison. He is scheduled for a late 2016 release.
On May 18, at the 2014 Billboard Music Awards, Eminem won the awards for Top Rap Artist and the Top Rap Album for his eighth studio album The Marshall Mathers LP 2. Macklemore & Ryan Lewis won Top Rap Song for "Can't Hold Us". Drake, Jay-Z, J. Cole and Pitbull were also nominated in various categories.
On May 28, the sale of Dr. Dre and Jimmy Iovine's Beats Electronics to Apple Inc. was finalized. The deal for 3 billion dollars, earned Dr. Dre hundreds of millions of dollars, making him the richest rapper in the game.

On May 31, OTF NuNu, a member of Lil Durk's OTF crew, was shot and killed in Chicago. He was sitting in a parked SUV at the Chatham Village Square Mall on the city's South Side when the shooter walked up to the vehicle and fired several rounds at NuNu. He was struck multiple times and tried to escape the scene in the SUV before crashing into a nearby store.

June
On June 1, 50 Cent, Nas, Nicki Minaj, Lil Wayne, Young Money, Wiz Khalifa, Trey Songz, DJ Mustard, YG, Ty Dolla Sign, Kid Ink, Sevyn Streeter, Bunji Garlin, Action Bronson, and Troy Ave performed on the main stage during 2014's Hot 97 Summer Jam. Most notably, the hip hop group G-Unit including 50 Cent, Lloyd Banks, Young Buck and Tony Yayo reunited.
On June 6, JayAre of Cali Swag District died of sickle cell anemia.
On June 9, in an interview with Bootleg Kev, B.o.B announced his new record label imprint, No Genre, named after his 2010 mixtape.
On June 10, Eminem became the first recording artist to receive two Digital Single Diamond Awards from the RIAA. They were for his singles "Not Afraid" and "Love The Way You Lie" singles, which both surpassed the 10 million threshold for a combination of sales and streams.
On June 18, a release date of August 14, 2015 was announced for the N.W.A biopic Straight Outta Compton.
On June 29, at the BET Awards 2014, Drake won Best Male Hip-Hop Artist, Nicki Minaj won Best Female Hip-Hop Artist and Young Money won Best Group. The same day that Dizaster's conditional ban from King of the Dot.

July

On July 11, Eminem became the first rapper to headline London's Wembley Stadium, which can hold up to 90,000 people. Fellow Detroit-based rapper Danny Brown and alternative hip hop group Odd Future, led by Tyler, The Creator, served as Eminem's opening acts for the shows, respectively. The same day that Meek Mill was sentenced to three to six months in jail for probation violations.
On July 23, Busta Rhymes announced his departure from Cash Money Records.

August
On August 1, Remy Ma was released from prison after more than six years behind bars.
On August 24, Suge Knight and two others were shot multiple times during a Chris Brown-hosted event at a West Hollywood nightclub. Knight was taken to an area hospital. The same day that Young Jeezy was arrested before performing at the Irvine, California stop on the Under The Influence Tour. This was in connection with the deadly shooting in the backstage area, two days prior on another stop of the tour in Mountain View, California. When the police raided his tour bus, they found an assault rifle assumed to belong to Jeezy as well guns on several members of his entourage. His bail was set at one million dollars.

October
On October 28, Juvenile re-signed with Cash Money Records.

November
On November 4, two members of Freddie Gibbs' entourage were shot multiple times in Brooklyn after a performance at Rough Trade in Williamsburg, NY, both men were taken to the hospital with non-life-threatening injuries.

December
On December 2, Meek Mill was released from prison after serving nearly four months for probation violation.
On December 16, Bobby Shmurda was arrested for alleged involvement in multiple shootings and drug trafficking in New York.

Released albums
{| class="wikitable" style="text-align:center;"
|-
! scope="col"| Release Date
! scope="col"| Artist(s)
! scope="col"| Album
! scope="col"| Record label(s)
! scope="col"| Notes
|-
|rowspan="2"|January 2
|Baracuda & Modulok
|Hydra
|Fishgang, Takaba
|
|-
|Sarkodie
|Sarkology
|Duncwills Entertainment 
|
Nominated for World's Best Album at the 2014 World Music Awards
Singles: "Illuminati", "Down on One", "Preach", etc.
|-
|January 7
|Kid Ink
|My Own Lane
|Tha Alumni Music Group, 88 Classic, RCA Records
|
Debuted at No. 3 on the Billboard 200
Singles: "Show Me", "Iz U Down", "Main Chick"
|-
|rowspan="2"|January 9
|Burgundy Fats (Self Jupiter)
|The Legend of 1900
|Voila Entertainment, AugustBouy Music, Sleepy Hollow Records
|
|-
| Úlfur Kolka
| Borgaraleg Óhlýðni
| Vesturbær
|-
|January 14
|Zion I
|The Masters of Ceremony
|Live Up Records
|
|-
|rowspan="5"|January 21
|The Nope(Moka Only & Psy)
|Sinus EP
|URBNET
|
|-
|Step Brothers(The Alchemist & Evidence)
|Lord Steppington
|Rhymesayers Entertainment
|
Debuted at No. 60 on the Billboard 200
Singles: "Step Masters", "Mums In The Garage"
|-
|Transit
|Super Man Took Steroids
|Transit
|
|-
|Trae tha Truth & The Worlds Freshest
|The Tonite Show
|Empire Distribution, Fresh in the Flesh
|
|-
|Ty Dolla Sign
|Beach House EP
|Taylor Gang Records, Atlantic Records
|
Debuted at No. 51 on the Billboard 200
Singles: "Paranoid", "Or Nah", and "Paranoid (Remix)"
|-
|rowspan="3"|January 28
|Isaiah Rashad
|Cilvia Demo
|Top Dawg Entertainment
|
Debuted at No. 40 on the Billboard 200
|-
|Qwazaar & Batsauce
|Stress Chasers
|Galapagos4
|
|-
|Andy Mineo
|Never Land
|Reach Records
|
Debuted at No. 13 on the Billboard 200
|-
||January 31
|Noah23 & Horse Head
|Delicate Genius
|Plague Language
|
|-
|rowspan="3"|February 4
|Lil Wyte & Frayser Boy
|B.A.R. (Bay Area Representatives)
|Hypnotize Minds, Wyte Music, Select-O-Hits
|
|-
|Prince Po & Oh No
|Animal Serum
|Wandering Worx
|
|-
|Young Fathers
|Dead
|Anticon, Big Dada
|
|-
|rowspan="3"|February 11
|Bike for Three!
|So Much Forever
|Fake Four Inc.
|
|-
|Good Belt Gang
|Resource Room
|Militainment Business
|
|-
|Willie the Kid & Bronze Nazareth
|The Living Daylights
|Embassy Ent., Black Day In July Productions
|
|-
|rowspan="5"|February 18
|The Doppelgangaz
|Peace Kehd
|Groggy Pack Entertainment
|
Singles: "Holla Holla x2", "KnowntchooTahLie"
|-
|The Grouch & Eligh
|The Tortoise and the Crow
|The Grouch & Eligh Music
|
Triple album; features one disc by The Grouch & Eligh, entitled 333, one disc by The Grouch, entitled Lighthouses, and one disc by Eligh, entitled Nomads.
|-
|Prodigy
|The Most Infamous
|Infamous Records
|
|-
|Juvenile
|The Fundamentals
|Rap-A-Lot Records
|
|-
|Verbal Kent
|Sound of the Weapon
|Mello Music Group
|
|-
|February 23
|Noah23
|Rare Gems
|Plague Language
|
|-
|rowspan="5"|February 25
|Kid Cudi
|Satellite Flight: The Journey to Mother Moon
|Wicked Awesome Records, Republic Records
|
Debuted at No. 4 on the Billboard 200
|-
|Homeboy Sandman
|White Sands
|Stones Throw Records
|
|-
|Schoolboy Q
|Oxymoron
|Top Dawg Entertainment, Interscope Records
|
Debuted at No. 1 on the Billboard 200
Singles: "Yay Yay", "Collard Greens", "Man of the Year", "Break the Bank", "Studio"
|-
|Stat Quo
|ATLA: All This Life Allows, Vol. 1
|ATLA Music
|
|-
|T. Mills
|All I Wanna Do
|Columbia Records
|
Debuted at No. 16 on the Billboard Top Rap Albums
Singles: "All I Wanna Do"
|-
|March 1
|Calle 13
|Multi Viral
|El Abismo
|
Singles: "Multi_Viral", "El Aguante"
|-
|rowspan="3"|March 3
|Chali 2na
|Manphibian Music: Against the Current EP 2
|Chali 2na
|
|-
|Pharrell Williams
|G I R L
|Black Lot Music, Columbia Records
|
Debuted at No. 2 on the Billboard 200
Singles: "Happy", "Marilyn Monroe", "Come Get It Bae"
Certified Gold
|-
|Rick Ross
|Mastermind
|Maybach Music Group, Slip-n-Slide Records, Def Jam Recordings
|
Debuted at No. 1 on the Billboard 200
Singles: "The Devil Is a Lie", "War Ready", "Thug Cry"
|-
|rowspan="4"|March 4
|Black Milk
|Glitches in the Break
|Computer Ugly Records
|
|-
|Clyde Carson
|Playboy
|Moe Doe Entertainment
|
|-
|O.S.T.R. & Marco Polo
|Kartagina
|Asfalt Records
|
Debuted at No. 1 on the Polish Charts
Certified Gold in Poland
|-
|Wax & Batsauce
|The Soledad Brothers
|Galapagos4
|
|-
|rowspan="2"|March 11
|Illmaculate
|Clay Pigeons
| Illmaculate
|
|-
|Young Money
|Rise of an Empire
|Young Money Entertainment, Cash Money Records, Republic Records
|
Debuted at No. 7 on the Billboard 200
Singles: "We Alright", "Trophies", "Lookin Ass Nigga"
|-
|March 14
|Farid Bang
|Killa
|Banger Musik
|
|-
|rowspan="8"|March 18
|Ana Tijoux
|Vengo
|Nacional Records
|
|-
|Cyne
|All My Angles Are Right
|Hometapes
|
|-
|Freddie Gibbs & Madlib
|Piñata
|Madlib Invazion
|
Debuted at No. 39 on the Billboard 200
Singles: "Thuggin'", "Shame", "Deeper"
|-
|Nocando
|Jimmy the Burnout
|Hellfyre Club
|
|-
|Onyx
|Wakedafucup
|Mad Money
|
Singles: "Wakedafucup"
|-
|Ra Scion
|Sharper Tool; Bigger Weapon
|SCIONtific Records
|
|-
|Sisyphus
|Sisyphus
|Flaming Pop, Ryan Lott Music, New Jerusalem
|
|-
|YG
|My Krazy Life
|Pu$haz Ink, CTE World, Def Jam Recordings
|
Debuted at No. 2 on the Billboard 200
Singles: "My Nigga", "Left, Right", "Who Do You Love?"
|-
|March 20
|Phyno
|No Guts No Glory
|Sputnet Records, Penthauze Music
|
Singles: "Ghost Mode", "Man of the Year (Obago)", "Parcel", "O Set"
|-
|rowspan="5"|March 25
|Axe Murder Boyz
|The Garcia Brothers
|Canonize Productions, Psychopathic Records
|
|-
|Christon Gray
|School of Roses
|Collision Records
|
Debuted at No. 44 on the Billboard 200
|-
|Grieves
|Winter & the Wolves
|Rhymesayers Entertainment
|
|-
|Lil Debbie
|California Sweetheart
|Lil Debbie Records
|
|-
|Sage the Gemini
|Remember Me
|Republic Records
|
Debuted at No. 47 on the Billboard 200
Singles: "Red Nose", "Gas Pedal", "College Drop", "Down on Your Luck"
|-
|March 26
|Mestizo
|Underlord
|Machina Muerte
|
|-
|March 27
|The Cloaks (Awol One & Gel Roc)
|The Cloaks
|Abolano Records
|
|-
|March 28
|Jesse Jagz
|Jagz Nation Vol. 2: Royal Niger Company
|Jagz Nation
|
Singles: "The Search (Radio)"
|-
|rowspan="6"|April 1
|Big Hutch
|The Big Hit
|West World Records, Big Shot Music Group
|
|-
|CunninLynguists
|Strange Journey Volume Three
|Bad Taste Records
|
|-
|Giovanni Marks
|C.O.A.T.
|Get Crev Laboratories
|
|-
|Mobb Deep
|The Infamous Mobb Deep
|Infamous Records, RED Distribution
|
Debuted at No. 49 on the Billboard 200
Singles: "Taking You off Here", "Say Something"
|-
|Nick Cannon
|White People Party Music
|N'Credible Entertainment
|
Singles: "Me Sexy", "Dance Floor", "Looking for a Dream"
|-
|Smoke DZA
|Dream. Zone. Achieve
|R.F.C. Music Group
|
Debuted at No. 30 on the Top R&B/Hip Hop Albums
Singles: "Legends In the Making (Ashtray, Pt. 2)"
|-
|April 8
|Chuck Inglish
|Convertibles
|Sounds Like Fun Records, Federal Prism Records
|
Debuted at No. 24 on the Top R&B/Hip Hop Albums
Singles: "Swervin'", "Came Thru/Easily", "Legs"
|-
|April 11
|Sole & DJ Pain 1
|Warfare
|Black Canyon Music
|
|-
|rowspan="8"|April 15
|Da' T.R.U.T.H.
|Heartbeat
|Mixed Bag Records
|
Debuted at No. 84 on the Billboard 200
|-
|Dizzy Wright
|State of Mind
|Funk Volume
|
Debuted at No. 54 on the Billboard 200
Singles: "Everywhere I Go"
|-
|Messy Marv, The Jacka & Blanco
|One Hunnid
|Guerrilla Entertainment
|
|-
|Locksmith
|A Thousand Cuts
|Landmark Entertainment
|
|-
|Pharoahe Monch
|PTSD
|W.A.R. Media, Duck Down Music Inc.
|
Debuted at No. 102 on the Billboard 200
Singles: "Damage", "Bad M.F."
|-
|Nas
|Illmatic XX (Illmatic reissue)
|Columbia Records
|
|-
|Sleep & Maulskull
|Oregon Failure
|Sleep of Oldominion LLC
|
|-
|Timbuktu
|How Huge: The Legend of Howard Huge
|Droppin' Science Productions
|
|-
|April 17
|Ceschi
|Forgotten Forever
|Cooler Than Cucumbers Records
|
Limited to 100 vinyl copies with exclusive handmade artwork for each copy.
|-
|April 18
| Ten Typ Mes
|Trzeba było zostać dresiarzem
|Alkopoligamia.com
|
Debuted at No. 4 on the Polish Charts
Certified Gold in Poland
|-
|rowspan="2"|April 20
|Lil Wyte
|No Sick Days
|Wyte Music, Hypnotize Minds
|
|-
|N.O.R.E.
|Noreaster
|Militainment Business
|
|-
|rowspan="11"|April 22
|Asher Roth
|RetroHash
|Federal Prism Records, Pale Fire
|
Debuted at No. 45 on the Billboard 200
Singles: "Tangerine Girl", "Fast Life"
|-
|Army of the Pharaohs
|In Death Reborn
|Enemy Soil, Babygrande Records, Demigodz Records
|
Debuted at No. 63 on the Billboard 200
|-
|Blueprint
|Respect the Architect
|Weightless Recordings
|
|-
|Daz Dillinger
|Weed Money
|Felder Entertainment Inc., D.P.G. Recordz
|
Singles: "What's Your Pleasure", "The Reason Why"
|-
|Future
|Honest
|A-1 Recordings, Freebandz, Epic Records
|
Debuted at No. 2 on the Billboard 200
Singles: "Karate Chop", "Honest", "Shit", "Move That Dope", "Covered N Money", "I Won"
|-
|Iggy Azalea
|The New Classic
|Island Records
|
Debuted at No. 3 on the Billboard 200
Singles: "Work", "Bounce", "Change Your Life", "Fancy", "Black Widow"
|-
|K Camp
|In Due Time
|Interscope Records
|
Debuted at No. 40 on the Top R&B/Hip Hop Albums
Singles: "Money Baby", "Cut Her Off", "Blessing", "Turn Up for a Check"
|-
|Shabaam Sahdeeq
|Keepers of the Lost Art
|Below System
|
|-
|Termanology
|Mas Goya
|ST. Records
|
|-
|Yukmouth
|GAS (Grow and Sale)
|Smoke-a-Lot Records
|
|-
|Zion I
|Libations
|Live Up Records
|
|-
|rowspan="2"|April 28
|Aim
|Drum Machines & VHS Dreams
|ATIC Records
|
|-
|Radioinactive
|Hip-Hop Helmet
|Flying Carpet Studios, Laitdbac
|
|-
|rowspan="8"|April 29
|Bas
|Last Winter
|Dreamville Records, Interscope Records
|
 Debuted at No. 103 on the Billboard 200
|-
|Chuuwee
|Cool World
|Amalgam Digital
|
|-
|Intuition & Equalibrum
|Intuition & Equalibrum
|Kinda Neat
|
|-
|J-Live
|Around the Sun
|Mortier Music
|
|-
|Propaganda
|Crimson Cord
|Humble Beast Records
|
 Debuted at No. 55 on the Billboard 200
|-
|Rapper Big Pooh & Roc C
|Trouble In the Neighborhood
|New World Color
|
|-
|Social Club
|Misfits 2
|Social Club
|
Debuted at No. 59 on the Billboard 200
|-
|Styles P
|Phantom and the Ghost
|Phantom Entertainment, New Music Cartel, Empire Distribution
|
Debuted at No. 74 on the Billboard 200
Singles: "Sour"
|-
|rowspan="4"|May 6
|Atmosphere
|Southsiders
|Rhymesayers Entertainment
|
Debuted at No. 8 on the Billboard 200
|-
|Beckah Shae
|Champion
|Shae Shoc Records
|
|-
|People Under the Stairs
|12 Step Program
|PL70 Records, PUTS Records
|
|-
|Tech N9ne
|Strangeulation
|Strange Music
|
Debuted at No. 5 on the Billboard 200
|-
|rowspan="2"|May 9
|Kollegah
|King
|Selfmade Records
|
Singles: "Alpha", "AKs im Wandschrank", "King", "Du bist Boss"
Debuted at No. 1 on the German, Austrian and Swiss album charts
Certified Platinum in Germany and Gold in Austria 
|-
|The Worlds Freshest & Freddie Gibbs
|The Tonite Show
|Empire Recordings, Fresh in the Flesh
|
|-
|rowspan="3"|May 13
|Boondox
|Abaddon
|Psychopathic Records
|
|-
|Iamsu!
|Sincerely Yours
| HBK Gang Records, Alternative Distribution Alliance
|
Debuted at No. 50 on the Billboard 200
Singles: "Only That Real", "I Love My Squad"
|-
|Moka Only
|Sex Money Moka
|Urbnet
|
|-
|May 17
|Tede
|#kurt_rolson
|Wielkie Joł
|
Debuted at No. 3 on the Polish Charts
Singles: "Feat.", "#john_rambo", "CMRT"
|-
|rowspan="2"|May 19
|The Roots
|...And Then You Shoot Your Cousin
|Def Jam Recordings
|
Debuted at No. 11 on the Billboard 200
Singles: "When the People Cheer"
|-
|Blu
|Good To Be Home
|New World Color, Nature Sounds
|
|-
|rowspan="2"|May 20
|Deniro Farrar
|Rebirth EP
|Vice Records
|
|-
|eMC
|The Turning Point
|Penalty Recordings
|
|-
|rowspan="7"|May 27
|Gangsta Boo & La Chat
|Witch
|Phixieous Entertainment
|
|-
|Hit-Boy & HS87
|We the Plug
|Hits Since '87, Interscope Records
|
|-
|Kool Keith
|Demolition Crash
|Junkadelic Music
|
|-
|Meyhem Lauren & Buckwild
|Silk Pyramids
|Thrice Great
|
|-
|MJG
|Too Pimpin' 2.0
|MJG Muzik
|
|-
|Skyzoo & Torae
|Barrel Brothers
|First Generation Rich Inc, Internal Affairs Ent, Loyalty Digital Corp, Empire Recordings
|
|-
|Tedashii
|Below Paradise
|Reach Records
|
Debuted at No. 17 on the Billboard 200
|-
|rowspan="6"|June 3
|50 Cent
|Animal Ambition 
|G-Unit Records, Caroline Records
|
Debuted at No. 4 on the Billboard 200
Singles: "Hold On", "Pilot", "Smoke", "Hustler", "Chase the Paper", "Everytime I Come Around", "Irregular Heartbeat", "Winners Circle", "Twisted"
|-
|Apathy
|Connecticut Casual
|Demigodz Records, Dirty Version Records
|
|-
|Big Smo
|Kuntry Livin'
|Elektra Nashville, Warner Music Nashville
|
Debuted at No. 31 on the Billboard 200
|-
|Die Antwoord
|Donker Mag
|Zef Records
|
|-
|Mcenroe
|Burnt Orange
|Peanuts & Corn Records
|
|-
|Sage Francis
|Copper Gone
|Strange Famous Records
|
|-
|June 8
|Bones
|Garbage
|TeamSESH
|
|-
|rowspan="8"|June 10
|Body Count
|Manslaughter
|Sumerian Records
|
Debuted at No. 102 on the Billboard 200
Singles: "Talk Shit, Get Shot"
|-
|Canibus
|Fait Accompli
|RBC Records
|
Singles: "Historic"
|-
|Cisco Adler
|Coastin'''
|Bananabeat Records
|
|-
|HRSMN
|Historic EP|RBC Records
|
|-
|¡Mayday! & Murs
|¡MursDay!|Strange Music
|
Debuted at No. 45 on the Billboard 200
Singles: "Tabletops"
|-
|Open Mike Eagle
|Dark Comedy|Mello Music Group
|
|-
|The Polish Ambassador
|Pushing Through the Pavement|Jumpsuit Records
|
|-
|Sole & DJ Pain 1
|Death Drive|Black Canyon
|
|-
|June 11
|Ka
|1200 B.C.|Iron Works
|
|-
|June 13
|DJ Vadim
|Dubcatcher|BBE Music
|
|-
||June 15
|Shady Blaze & BLVCKHXVRT
|Shady HXVRT|Green Ova Records
|
|-
|rowspan="5"|June 17
|Canibus
|The Masterpiece Collection 
|Babygrande Records
|
|-
|Cappadonna
|Hook Off 
|Protect-Ya-Neck Records
|
|-
|Dessa
|Parts of Speech, Re-Edited 
|Doomtree Records
|
|-
|Jeru the Damaja
|The Hammer| Hedspinn Records
|
|-
|Swollen Members
|Brand New Day| Battle Axe Records
|
|-
|June 23
|G-Eazy
|These Things Happen 
|BPG, RVG, RED Distribution
|
Debuted at No. 3 on the Billboard 200
|-
|rowspan="9"|June 24
|Ab-Soul
|These Days...|Top Dawg Entertainment
|
Debuted at No. 11 on the Billboard 200
|-
|Alias
|Pitch Black Prism|Anticon
|
|-
|Buckshot & P-Money
|Backpack Travels|Dirty, Dawn Raid, Duck Down
|
|-
|Bubba Sparxxx
|Made On McCosh Mill Road|New South, E1 Entertainment
|
|-
|Cashis
|Euthanasia|Bogish Brand Entertainment
|
|-
|Def3 & Factor
|Wildlife|Ship Records, URBNET
|
|-
|K.Flay
|Life as a Dog|Bummer Picnic Records
|
|-
|Riff Raff
|Neon Icon|Mad Decent
|
Debuted at No. 22 on the Billboard 200
Singles: "How to Be the Man"
|-
|Z-Ro
|The Crown|XMG
|
|-
|June 30
|Muneshine
|In Transit|Scissor Records
|
|-
|rowspan="2"|July 1
|Cam'ron
|1st of the Month Vol. 1|Killa Entertainment
|
|-
|Sadistik
|Ultraviolet|Fake Four Inc.
|
|-
|July 3
|Main Flow
|The Cincinnati Kid|Dopeshit Records, Wannabattle Records
|
|-
|July 4
|Gucci Mane
|Trap House 4|1017 Brick Squad Records, 101 Distribution
|
Debuted at No. 153 on the Billboard 200
|-
|July 7
|Mike Stud
|Closer|Electric Feel Music
|
Debuted at No. 13 on the Billboard 200
|-
|rowspan="4"|July 15
|Cashis
|Bogish Boy Vol. 1|Bogish Brand Entertainment
|
|-
|rowspan="2"| Madlib
|Rock Konducta Pt. 1|rowspan="2"|Madlib Invazion
|
|-
|Rock Konducta Pt. 2|
|-
|Reks
|Eyes Watching God|Brick Records
|
|-
|July 17
|Felix Brothers (Gucci Mane, Young Dolph & PeeWee Longway)
|Felix Brothers|1017 Brick Squad Records, 101 Distribution
|
|-
|July 18
|Cassper Nyovest
|Tsholofelo|Family Tree, Kalawa Jazmee Records, Universal Music
|
Singles: "Gusheshe", "Doc Shebeleza", "Phumakim"
|-
|rowspan="2"|July 22
|Common
|Nobody's Smiling|ARTium Recordings, Def Jam Recordings
|
Debuted at No. 6 on the Billboard 200
Singles: "Kingdom", "Speak My Piece", "Diamonds"
|-
|Cormega
|Mega Philosophy|Slimstyle Records
|
|-
|July 23
|Noah23 & David Klopek
|Light Years|
|
|-
|rowspan="7"|July 29
|Dark Lotus
|The Mud, Water, Air & Blood|Psychopathic Records
|
Debuted at No. 43 on the Billboard 200
|-
|Gucci Mane
|The Oddfather|1017 Brick Squad Records, 101 Distribution
|
|-
|MarQ Spekt & Blockhead
|JustPlayWithIt|HiPNOTT Records
|
|-
|PartyNextDoor
|PartyNextDoor Two|OVO Sound, Warner Bros. Records
|
Debuted at No. 15 on the Billboard 200
|-
|Planet Asia & TzariZM
|Via Satellite|Doxside Music Group
|
|-
|Shabazz Palaces
|Lese Majesty|Sub Pop Records
|
|-
| Sir Michael Rocks
| Banco|6 Cell Phones
|
Debuted at No. 118 on the Billboard 200
Singles: "Memo"
|-
|rowspan="2"|August 1
|Cam'ron
|1st of the Month Vol. 2|Killa Entertainment
|
Singles: "So Bad"
|-
|Chuck D
|The Black In Man|Spitdigital
|
|-
|rowspan="5"|August 5
|AmpLive
|Headphone Concerto|Plug Research Music
|
|-
|Armand Hammer (Billy Woods & Elucid)
|Furtive Movements|Backwoodz Studioz
|
|-
|Ces Cru
|Codename: Ego Stripper|Strange Music
|
Debuted at No. 40 on the Billboard 200
|-
|Lil Debbie
|California Sweetheart Pt. 2|Lil Debbie Records
|
|-
|Swoope
|Sinema|Collision Records
|
Debuted at No. 55 on the Billboard 200
|-
|rowspan="5"|August 12
|Chuuwee
|The Chuuwee Channel|NCR
|
|-
|Dilated Peoples
|Directors of Photography|Rhymesayers Entertainment
|
Debuted at No. 41 on the Billboard 200
|-
|The Underachievers
|Cellar Door: Terminus Ut Exordium|Brainfeeder
|
Debuted at No. 86 on the Billboard 200
|-
|Twista
|Dark Horse|Get Money Gang Entertainment, Caroline Records
|
Debuted at No. 40 on the Billboard 200
Singles: "Throwin' My Money", "It's Yours"
|-
|Watsky
|All You Can Do|Steel Wool Media, Welk Music Group
|
Debuted at No. 33 on the Billboard 200
|-
||August 15
|Gucci Mane
|Gucci Vs Guwop|1017 Brick Squad Records, 101 Distribution
|
|-
|rowspan="4"|August 19
|Wiz Khalifa
|Blacc Hollywood|Atlantic Records Rostrum Records
|
Debuted at No. 1 on the Billboard 200
Singles: "We Dem Boyz", "KK", "You and Your Friends", "Stayin Out All Night", "Promises", "So High"
|-
|Slaine
|The King of Everything Else|Suburban Noize Records
|
|-
|Statik Selektah
|What Goes Around|Showoff Records, Duck Down Music Inc.
|
|-
|CALiENS
|CALiENS|Caliens
|
 Nominated for "Best Hip Hop Album" at the San Diego Music Award 2015
|-
||August 23
|Noah23
|Street Astrology|
|
|-
||August 25
|G-Unit
|The Beauty of Independence|G-Unit Records
|
Debuted at No. 17 on the Billboard 200
|-
|rowspan="4"|August 26
|Cash Out
|Let's Get It|Bases Loaded, E1 Music
|
Debuted at No. 43 on the Billboard 200
Singles: "She Twerkin", "Mexico", "She Wanna Ride"
|-
|DJ Mustard
|10 Summers|Pu$haz Ink, Roc Nation, Republic Records
|
 Debuted at No. 143 on the Billboard 200
Singles: "Down on Me"
|-
|Paranoid Castle
|Welcome to Success|Side Road Records
|
|-
|Souls of Mischief
|There Is Only Now|Linear Labs
|
|-
| rowspan="2" |September 1
|Cam'ron
|1st of the Month Vol. 3|Killa Entertainment
|
|-
|Father
|Young Hot Ebony|Awful Records
|
|-
|rowspan="3"|September 2
|Homeboy Sandman
|Hallways|Stones Throw Records
|
|-
|Jeezy
|Seen It All: The Autobiography|Def Jam Recordings, CTE World
|
Debuted at No. 2 on the Billboard 200
Singles: "Me OK", "Seen It All"
|-
|The Killjoy Club
|Reindeer Games|Psychopathic Records
|
|-
|rowspan="8"|September 9
|Busdriver
|Perfect Hair|Big Dada
|
|-
|Ed O.G.
|After All These Years|5th & Union
|
|-
|Jhené Aiko
|Souled Out|ARTium Recordings, Def Jam Recordings
|
Debuted at No. 3 on the Billboard 200
Singles: "To Love & Die", "The Pressure"
|-
|Jim Jones
|We Own the Night Pt. 2: Memoirs of a Hustler|Vampire Life, Empire Distribution
|
Singles: "Wit the Sh!t"
|-
|Lecrae
|Anomaly|Reach Records
|
Debuted at No. 1 on the Billboard 200
|-
|P. Reign
|Dear America EP|RCA Records
|
|-
|Rittz
|Next to Nothing|Strange Music
|
Debuted at No. 14 on the Billboard 200
|-
|Slimkid3 & DJ Nu-Mark
|Slimkid3 & DJ Nu-Mark|Delicious Vinyl
|
|-
|rowspan="5"|September 16
|Chris Brown
|X|RCA Records
|
Singles: "Fine China", "Don't Think They Know", "Love More", "Loyal", "New Flame"
|-
|Diabolic
|Fightin' Words|War Horse Records
|
|-
|Freeway & The Jacka
|Highway Robbery|Team Early Entertainment, The Artist Records
|
|-
|Joell Ortiz
|House Slippers|Penalty Entertainment
|
Debuted at No. 45 on the Billboard 200
Singles: "House Slippers", "Music Saved My Life"
|-
|Josh Baze
|Colour Blind|Cartel Records
|
|-
|September 22
|Professor Green
|Growing Up in Public|Virgin Records
|
Singles: "Lullaby"
|-
|September 23
|Snootie Wild
|Go Mode|Epic Records, CMG
|
|-
|rowspan="5"|September 30
|The Alchemist
|Rapper's Best Friend 3: An Instrumental Series|ALC
|
|-
|Buck 65
|Neverlove|Buck 65
|
|-
|Diamond D
|The Diam Piece|Dymond Mine Records
|
|-
|Madchild
|Switched On|Battle Axe Records
|
|-
|Saigon
|G.S.N.T. 3: The Troubled Times of Brian Carenard|Squid Ink Squad
|
|-
|October 1
|Cam'ron
|1st of the Month Vol. 4|Killa Entertainment
|
Singles: "Snapped"
|-
|October 3
|Childish Gambino
|Kauai|Glassnote Records
|
Debuted at No. 18 on the Billboard 200
|-
|rowspan="5"|October 7
|Bishop Nehru & MF Doom
|NehruvianDoom|Lex Records
|
|-
|Flying Lotus
|You're Dead!|Warp Records
|
Debuted at No. 19 on the Billboard 200
|-
|Pastor Troy
|Welcome to the Rap Game|Madd Society Records
|
|-
|Rapsody
|Beauty and the Beast|Jamla Records, Culture Over Everything
|
|-
|Vince Staples
|Hell Can Wait|Def Jam Recordings, ARTium Records
|
|-
|October 10
|Shindy
|FVCKB!TCHE$GETMONE¥|Sony Music, ersguterjunge, AMF Management
|
Debuted at No. 1 on the German, Austrian and Swiss album charts
|-
|rowspan="3"|October 14
|DJ Quik
|The Midnight Life|Mad Science Recordings, INgrooves Music Group
|
Debuted at No. 63 on the Billboard 200
|-
|The Game
|Blood Moon: Year of the Wolf|Blood Money Entertainment, eOne Music
|
Debuted at No. 7 on the Billboard 200
Singles: "Bigger Than Me", "Or Nah"
|-
|Hoodie Allen
|People Keep Talking|Hoodie Allen LLC.
|
Debuted at No. 8 on the Billboard 200
|-
|rowspan="3"|October 21
|Army of the Pharaohs
|Heavy Lies the Crown|Pazmanian Devil Music
|
|-
|T.I.
|Paperwork|Columbia Records, Grand Hustle Records
|
Debuted at No. 2 on the Billboard 200
Singles: "About the Money", "No Mediocre", "New National Anthem"
|-
|Logic
|Under Pressure|Def Jam Recordings, Visionary Music Group
|
Debuted at No. 4 on the Billboard 200
Singles: "Under Pressure", "Buried Alive"
|-
|October 24
|Run the Jewels
|Run the Jewels 2|Mass Appeal, Sony RED
|
Debuted at No. 96 on the Billboard 200, peaked at No. 50
Singles: "Blockbuster Night, Pt. 1", "Oh My Darling Don't Cry"
|-
|rowspan="4"|October 27
|Apollo Brown & Ras Kass
|Blasphemy|Mello Music Group
|
|-
|Chris Webby
|Chemically Imbalanced|Homegrown Music, E1 Music
|
Debuted at No. 25 on the Billboard 200
|-
|Stalley
|Ohio|Maybach Music Group, Atlantic Records
|
Debuted at No. 35 on the Billboard 200
Singles: "Always Into Something", "Jackin' Chevys", "One More Shot"
|-
|Trip Lee
|Rise|Reach Records
|
|-
|rowspan="3"|October 28
|Black Milk
|If There's a Hell Below|Computer Ugly Records
|
|-
|Jared Evan & Statik Selektah
|Still Blue|Showoff Records, Jared Evan Inc.
|
|-
|Young Chop
|Still|ChopSquad
|
|-
|October 30
|M.I
|The Chairman|Chocolate City
|
|-
|November 1
|Cam'ron
|1st of the Month Vol. 5|Killa Entertainment
|
Singles: "Touch the Sky"
|-
|rowspan="5"|November 4
|Joe Budden
|Some Love Lost|Mood Muzik Entertainment, E1 Music
|
Debuted at No. 55 on the Billboard 200
|-
|Jackie Hill-Perry
|The Art of Joy|Humble Beast
|
|-
|Teyana Taylor
|VII|Def Jam Recordings, GOOD Music
|
Singles: "Maybe", "Business", "Do Not Disturb"
|-
|Theophilus London
|Vibes|Warner Bros. Records
|
|-
|Too Short
|19,999: The EP|Dangerous Music, Empire Distribution
|
|-
|November 5
|The Lox
|The Trinity 2nd Sermon|D-Block Records
|
|-
|November 6
|Azealia Banks
|Broke with Expensive Taste|Azealia Banks, Prospect Park
|
Debuted at No. 30 on the Billboard 200
Singles: "Yung Rapunxel", "Heavy Metal and Reflective", "Chasing Time"
|-
|rowspan="4"|November 10
|Big K.R.I.T.
|Cadillactica|Def Jam Recordings, Cinematic Music Group
|
Debuted at No. 5 on the Billboard 200
Singles: "Pay Attention", "Cadillactica", "Soul Food"
|-
|Bobby Shmurda
|Shmurda She Wrote|Epic Records
|
Debuted at No. 79 on the Billboard 200
Singles: "Hot Nigga", "Bobby Bitch"
|-
|Hail Mary Mallon
|Bestiary|Rhymesayers Entertainment
|
Debuted at No. 96 on the Billboard 200
|-
|L.U.C
|Reflekcje o miłości apdejtowanej selfie|Warner Music Poland
|
Debuted at No. 32 on the Polish Charts
|-
|November 14
|Kool Savas
|Märtyrer|Essah Entertainment
|
Debuted at No. 1 on the German and Swiss album charts
|-
|rowspan="3"|November 18
|Havoc
|13 Reloaded|Hclass Entertainment
|
|-
|M.O.P.
|Street Certified|Nature Sounds
|
|-
|SD
|Truly Blessed|Truly Blessed, iHipHop Distribution
|
|-
|rowspan="5"|November 24
|Maino
|K.O.B. 2|Hustle Hard, Stage One
|
|-
|Pitbull
|Globalization|Mr. 305 Inc., RCA Records, Polo Grounds Music
|
Debuted at No. 18 on the Billboard 200
Singles: "Wild Wild Love", "Fireball", "Time of Our Lives", "Fun"
|-
|Prodigy & Boogz Boogetz
|Young Rollin Stonerz|Infamous Records
|
|-
|Rick Ross
|Hood Billionaire|Maybach Music Group, Def Jam Recordings
|
Debuted at No. 6 on the Billboard 200
Singles: "Elvis Presley Blvd.", "Keep Doin' That (Rich Bitch)", "Nickel Rock"
|-
|Shady Records
|Shady XV|Shady Records, Interscope Records
|
Debuted at No. 3 on the Billboard 200
Singles: "Guts Over Fear", "Y'all Ready Know", "Detroit Vs. Everybody"
|-
|rowspan="2"|November 25
|Insane Clown Posse
|House of Wax|Psychopathic Records
|
|-
|Your Old Droog
|Your Old Droog|Droog Recordings
|
|-
|rowspan="2"|December 1
|Cam'ron
|1st of the Month Vol. 6|Killa Entertainment
|
|-
|Red Café
|In Us We Trust: The Compilation|Shakedown Entertainment
|
|-
|rowspan="4"|December 2
|Astro
|Computer Era|Grade A Tribe Records
|
Singles: "Champion"
|-
|Paul Wall
|The Po-Up Poet|Paul Wall Music
|
|-
|Trademark Da Skydiver
|Return of the Super Villain|iHipHop Distribution
|
|-
|Wu-Tang Clan
|A Better Tomorrow|Warner Bros. Records
|
Debuted at No. 29 on the Billboard 200
Singles: "Keep Watch", "Ron O'Neal", "Ruckus In B Minor"
|-
|December 5
|OJ da Juiceman
|The Otis Williams Jr. Story|32 Entertainment
|
|-
|rowspan="6"|December 9
|rowspan="2"|E-40
|Sharp On All 4 Corners: Corner 1|rowspan="2"| Heavy on the Grind Entertainment
|
Debuted at No. 61 on the Billboard 200
Singles: "Red Cup", "Choices (Yup)"
|-
|Sharp On All 4 Corners: Corner 2|
Debuted at No. 197 on the Billboard 200
|-
|Ghostface Killah
|36 Seasons|Tommy Boy Records
|
Debuted at No. 94 on the Billboard 200
|-
|J. Cole
|2014 Forest Hills Drive|Dreamville Records, Roc Nation, Columbia Records
|
Debuted at No. 1 on the Billboard 200
Singles: "Apparently", "Wet Dreamz", "No Role Modelz"
Certified Platinum
|-
|Royce da 5'9" & DJ Premier
|PRhyme|PRhyme Records
|
Debuted at No. 59 on the Billboard 200
Singles: "Courtesy"
|-
|Termanology
|Shut Up and Rap|Brick Records
|
|-
|December 10
|Yukmouth, Chino Chino and P. Hustle
|The Cream Team|Da Hustle Ent., Rapbay, Urbanlife Distribution
|
|-
|rowspan="2"|December 15
|Nicki Minaj
|The Pinkprint|Young Money Entertainment, Cash Money Records, Republic Records
|
Debuted at No. 2 on the Billboard 200
Singles: "Pills n Potions", "Anaconda", "Only", "Bed of Lies", "Truffle Butter", "The Night is Still Young"
Certified Gold
|-
|YG
|Blame It on the Streets|Pu$haz Ink, CTE World, Def Jam Recordings
|
Debuted at No. 118 on the Billboard 200
|-
|rowspan="4"|December 16
|Crooked I
|Sex, Money & Hip-Hop|Treacherous C.O.B., SMH Records
|
|-
|Chief Keef
|Nobody|12hunna
|
|-
|JR & PH7 x Chuuwee
|Meanwhile off Mack|Below System Records
|
|-
|Ludacris
|Burning Bridges|Def Jam Recordings
|
|-
|rowspan="2"|December 25
|Fabolous
|The Young OG Project|Desert Storm Records, Def Jam Recordings
|
Debuted at No. 12 on the Billboard 200
|-
|Militainment
|N.O.R.E. Presents: DRINKS|Militainment Business
|
|-
|December 31
|Skillz & Bink
|Made in Virginia|Big Kidz Entertainment
|
|}

Highest-charting songs

 Highest first-week sales 

‡ By the time 2014 Forest Hills Drive and The Pinkprint were released, Billboard had started counting total consumption (sales + streaming + track equivalent units) for the Billboard 200 chart. In pure album sales, 2014 Forest Hills Drive debuted with 354,000 copies, while The Pinkprint'' debuted with 198,000.

Highest critically reviewed albums

Metacritic

AnyDecentMusic?

See also
Previous article: 2013 in hip hop music
Next article: 2015 in hip hop music
List of Billboard number-one rap albums of 2014

References

2010s in hip hop music
Hip hop
Hip hop music by year